Orchard Court is an apartment block situated on the eastern side of Portman Square in London. Apartment number six was used by F section of the Special Operations Executive as an office for briefing agents during the Second World War.

Sources 
 Michael Richard Daniell Foot, SOE in France. An account of the Work of the British Special Operations Executive in France, 1940-1944, London, Her Majesty's Stationery Office, 1966, 1968 ; Whitehall History Publishing, in association with Frank Cass, 2004. Ce livre présente la version officielle britannique de l’histoire du SOE en France. Une référence essentielle sur le SOE.
 Peter Churchill, Missions secrètes en France, 1941-1943, Presses de la Cité, 1967.
  Marcel Ruby, La Guerre secrète. Les réseaux Buckmaster, Éditions France-Empire, 1985.

Special Operations Executive
Hotels in London